Graphomya maculata is a species of fly.  It is widespread and common in most parts of Europe and also occurs in North Africa including the Canary Islands. The thorax bears the same black and white pattern in both sexes. Females also have a black and white abdomen, while the male has orange colouration on the abdomen as seen in the picture.

References

Muscidae
Diptera of Africa
Muscomorph flies of Europe
Insects described in 1763
Taxa named by Giovanni Antonio Scopoli